The Ak Nogai are a division of the Nogai whose dialect forms the main base for the written Nogai language.

They live in northern Karachay–Cherkessia.

Sources
Wixman, Ronald. The Peoples of the USSR: An Ethnographic Handbook. (Armonk, New York: M. E. Sharpe, Inc, 1984) p. 7

Ethnic groups in Russia
Karachay-Cherkessia
Nogai people
Muslim communities of Russia